Ásta Eir Árnadóttir (born 23 August 1993) is an Icelandic footballer who plays Breiðablik in the Icelandic Úrvalsdeild kvenna and the Icelandic national team.

Club career
Ásta Eir started her senior team career with Breiðablik in 2009. In August 2018, she won the Icelandic Cup. She missed the 2020 season due to pregnancy.

International career
From 2008 to 2012, Ásta Eir played 25 games for Iceland's junior national teams. In February 2019, she was selected to the Icelandic senior national team ahead of its games in the Algarve Cup.

Personal life
Ásta's mother, Kristín Anna Arnþórsdóttir, was a multi-sport athlete who played 12 games for the Icelandic national football team and 8 games for the Icelandic national handball team where she scored 18 goals.

Honours

League
 Icelandic championship
 2015, 2018

Cups
 Icelandic Cup
 2016, 2018
Icelandic Women's Football Super Cup
 2014, 2019
 Icelandic League Cup
 2012, 2019

References

External links
 
 

1993 births
Living people
Asta Eir Arnadottir
Asta Eir Arnadottir
Asta Eir Arnadottir
Asta Eir Arnadottir
Women's association football defenders